is a Japanese television drama series premiered on Fuji TV network on 26 January 2010, starring Nana Eikura in the lead role. The 1st episode and the last episode are 69 minutes long.

Cast
Nana Eikura as Miki Tsunoda
Haruna Kawaguchi as Ai Tsunoda
Naohito Fujiki as Seiji Kirino
Jun Kaname as Shōta Nakahara
Anne as Marika Tachibana
Yasunori Danta as Jin Umezawa
Yoshino Kimura as Yukiko Sano
Shunji Igarashi as Kenji Nishijima
Jun Hasegawa as Yoshito Tazawa
Nana Katase as Chiaki Fujita
Mahiru Konno as Kotomi Kurita
Kurume Arisaka as Kyoko Shiraishi
Marie Machida as Sanae Kudo
Shige Uchida as Keisuke Suzuki
Yusei Tajima as Makoto Inoue
Aoba Kawai as Miho Hayashida
Emi Tanaka as Mai Mizuta

Awards
64th Television Drama Academy Awards: Best Supporting Actress: Anne
64th Television Drama Academy Awards: Best Theme Song: Don't Cry Anymore (miwa)

See also
Workplace politics

References

External links
  
 
 泣かないと決めた日(2010) at allcinema 

Japanese drama television series
2010 in Japanese television
2010 Japanese television series debuts
2010 Japanese television series endings
Fuji TV dramas